Tvoje lice zvuči poznato may refer to:

Croatian TV Show
 Tvoje lice zvuči poznato (Croatian TV series), Croatian version of the show Your Face Sounds Familiar
 Tvoje lice zvuči poznato (Croatian season 1), the first season of the Croatian version of the show Your Face Sounds Familiar
 Tvoje lice zvuči poznato (Croatian season 2), the second season of the Croatian version of the show Your Face Sounds Familiar
 Tvoje lice zvuči poznato (Croatian season 3), the third season of the Croatian version of the show Your Face Sounds Familiar
 Tvoje lice zvuči poznato (Croatian season 4), the fourth season of the Croatian version of the show Your Face Sounds Familiar

Serbian TV Show
 Tvoje lice zvuči poznato (Serbian TV series), Serbian version of the show Your Face Sounds Familiar
 Tvoje lice zvuči poznato (Serbian season 1), the first season of the Serbian version of the show Your Face Sounds Familiar
 Tvoje lice zvuči poznato (Serbian season 2), the second season of the Serbian version of the show Your Face Sounds Familiar
 Tvoje lice zvuči poznato (Serbian season 3), the third season of the Serbian version of the show Your Face Sounds Familiar
 Tvoje lice zvuči poznato (Serbian season 4), the fourth season of the Serbian version of the show Your Face Sounds Familiar